Femtech (or female technology) is a term applied to a category of software, diagnostics, products, and services that use technology often to focus on women's health. This sector includes fertility solutions, period-tracking apps, pregnancy and nursing care, women's sexual wellness, and reproductive system health care.

Overview
The concept of a digital women's health category is relatively new. Femtech was coined in 2016 by Ida Tin, a Danish entrepreneur who founded Clue, a period- and fertility-tracking app. As an industry, femtech largely encompasses any digital or standard health tools aimed at women's health, including wearables, internet-connected medical devices, mobile apps, hygiene products, and others.

Companies and products
There are numerous femtech companies offering a variety of different products throughout the world. Companies that produce period- and/or fertility-tracking mobile apps include, Clue, DOT, Glow, Eve, Cycles, My Calendar, Life, FertilityIQ, Extend Fertility, Forte Medical, Flo, Lady Cycle and others. Companies that offer services like IVF, egg freezing, and medical treatments include Univfy, Progyny, Apricity and Prelude Fertility. Valley Electronics created the original fertility tracking tech device, called the Lady-Comp fertility tracker, which was first produced in Germany in 1986 and which has a modernized model still on the market in addition to a newer variant of fertility tracking device called the Daysy fertility tracker, which was the first device to pair a fertility tracker with an app. Similarly, the fertility company, Ava, produces a wearable that tracks fertility. By contrast, Nurx provides a telemedicine service where women can get birth control prescribed via an app, and have the pills delivered. Twentyeight Health, another birth control delivery service, takes this model a step further by providing resources for underserved women and Medicaid populations. Companies like Gennev address menopause issues. Companies like Pregnancy+ and Amma pregnancy tracker in the pregnancy segment of femtech industry provide women with pregnancy tracking tools.

Several companies also produce internet-connected medical devices that are often paired with mobile apps to track specific data. For instance, Elvie and Willow produce a wearable breast pump. The Elvie breast pump also connects to an app. Elvie also offers a kegel-tracking device. Elvie was founded by entrepreneur, Tania Boler, and backed financially by entrepreneur-turned-investor, Nicole Junkermann, a specialist in the Femtech sector. Kegg recently launched a 2-in-1 fertility tracker that senses electrolyte levels of cervical fluid and assists the user in pelvic floor exercises.
Lioness produces a smart vibrator with an app that uses biofeedback to help people learn more about their own bodies. Other medical devices and implements produced in the femtech category may or may not use an internet connection. Joylux is a women's health technology company creating medical and feminine wellness devices under the vSculpt and vFit brands. Companies like L. and Flex offer alternatives to standard tampon and condom products. Thinx sells reusable underwear that absorbs menstrual blood. iPulse Medical sells a menstrual pain relief wearable device.

Swedish company Natural Cycles was the first to receive official approval to market its app as digital contraception in the European Union and in August 2018 the Food and Drug Administration approved marketing in the U.S. Controversy around the app as a contraceptive device grew stronger after numerous women in Stockholm reported unplanned pregnancies after using the app. After Swedish authorities concluded the investigation, the amount of unintended pregnancies was found to be in line with claims made by Natural Cycles.

Innovators in the breastfeeding/breast-pumping space like Milk Stork make the logistics of being a working, traveling, breastfeeding mom manageable through breast milk shipping services.

Venture capital investments 
In 2015, Femtech startups raised around $82 million in funding from investment firms.

In March 2017, it was reported that the total amount of funding raised by femtech companies since 2014 had reached $1.1 billion.

Frost & Sullivan Market Research report on Femtech states that the market is under penetrated but has the potential to reach $9.4 billion by 2024.

Maven, an online company focused on improved healthcare access, received $27 million to expand their services to breast milk delivery. Cora, which sells organic pads, tampons and personal care products, received $7.5 million to begin selling their products in Target stores.

In early 2019, Elvie raised $42 million in Series B funding, for a total of more than $50 million since their 2013 founding.

Estimates suggest that around $200 billion is being spent on femtech products each year.

According to Forbes, femtech companies face challenges in raising money, because women's health issues are not always understood by investors, women are underrepresented in the investment community, and female founders are reluctant to ask for money. Just 10% of global investment goes to female-led startups.

Data Bridge, a research firm, predicts that by 2026 the global fertility industry could raise up to $41 billion in sales, from $25 billion today. According to FemTech Analytics, the femtech market is
expected to grow to $60B by 2027.

Ethics 
There have been concerns about data-sharing practices in Femtech, particularly within fertility-trackers. Some apps have come under fire for ambiguous privacy ethics after it emerged that user data had been shared (without consent) with companies such as Facebook. This allowed Facebook, and other companies that Facebook shares their data with, to target users with fertility or pregnancy related products based around which point in their monthly menstrual cycle they were. Some have argued this is harmful, as it assumes things such as intended eventual pregnancy and disregards alternate conception outcomes such as termination or miscarriage.

References

Medical technology
Women's health